Michael Antony Cristobal Noble, Baron Glenkinglas, PC (13 March 1913 – 15 May 1984) was a Scottish Conservative and Unionist politician.

Noble was the youngest son of Sir John Noble, 1st Baronet, and the grandson of Sir Andrew Noble, 1st Baronet, and was educated at Eton College and Magdalen College, Oxford. A farmer, he was president of the Black Face Sheep Breeders' Association and the Highland Cattle Society. He was an Argyll County Councillor and a director of Associated Fisheries.

From a by-election in June 1958 until his retirement in 1974 he was Member of Parliament for Argyll.

Noble was a Scottish whip from 1960 and Lord Commissioner of the Treasury from 1961. He was Secretary of State for Scotland from 1962 to 1964 in the governments of Harold Macmillan and Alec Douglas-Home, taking over from John Maclay after the Night of the Long Knives. He returned to government as President of the Board of Trade in 1970 and as Minister for Trade from 1970 to 1972 under Edward Heath.

As Scottish Secretary, he presided over the last execution in Scotland when Henry John Burnett was hanged at Craiginches Prison in Aberdeen on the morning of 15 August 1963 by the hangman Harry Allen for the murder of merchant seaman Thomas Guyan.

On 3 May 1974 Noble was elevated with a life peerage as Baron Glenkinglas, of Cairndow in the County of Argyll.

Although he was a good 25 years younger than the architectural historian Harry Stuart Goodhart-Rendel, the two had a very friendly feud. Noble is said to have joked that they were "best of enemies."

He died in May 1984, aged 71.

References

Bibliography
Torrance, David, The Scottish Secretaries (Birlinn 2006)
Kidd, Charles, Williamson, David (editors). Debrett's Peerage and Baronetage (1990 edition). New York: St Martin's Press, 1990,

External links 
 

British Secretaries of State
UK MPs 1955–1959
UK MPs 1959–1964
UK MPs 1964–1966
UK MPs 1966–1970
UK MPs 1970–1974
UK MPs who were granted peerages
Scottish Conservative Party MPs
Unionist Party (Scotland) councillors
Members of the Privy Council of the United Kingdom
1913 births
1984 deaths
People educated at Eton College
Alumni of Magdalen College, Oxford
Glenkinglas
Younger sons of baronets
Unionist Party (Scotland) MPs
Presidents of the Board of Trade
Ministers in the Macmillan and Douglas-Home governments, 1957–1964
Life peers created by Elizabeth II